Stanzel is a surname. Notable people with the name include:

Franz Karl Stanzel (born 1923), Austrian literary critics
Scott Stanzel (born 1973), political appointee in the administration of President of the United States George W. Bush
Volker Stanzel (born 1948), German diplomat 

See also
Stansel